The women's 100 metre breaststroke event at the 2016 Summer Olympics took place on 7–8 August at the Olympic Aquatics Stadium.

Summary
U.S. swimmer Lilly King stormed home on the final lap in a match against Russia's Yuliya Yefimova to capture the sprint breaststroke title for the first time since Megan Quann topped the podium in 2000. With 15 metres to go, King launched a mighty surge to pass Yefimova by more than half a second for the gold medal with a time of 1:04.93. King's time also shaved 0.24 seconds off the Olympic record set by Australia's four-time Olympian Leisel Jones in Beijing in 2008. Yefimova finished with a silver in 1:05.50. King's teammate Katie Meili snared the final podium spot with a 1:05.69 for the bronze.

China's Shi Jinglin delivered a time of 1:06.37 to pick up the fourth spot, just ahead of Canada's Rachel Nicol (1:06.68) by about three tenths of a second. Iceland's Hrafnhildur Lúthersdóttir placed sixth in 1:07.18, while Lithuania's world-record holder and defending champion Rūta Meilutytė could not reproduce her effort from London 2012 with a seventh-place time in 1:07.32. Jamaica's Alia Atkinson, fourth-place finalist at the previous Games, rounded out the top eight with a 1:08.10.

The medals for the competition were presented by Richard Peterkin, IOC member from St. Lucia, and the gifts were presented by Donald Rukare, FINA bureau member.

Records
Prior to this competition, the existing world and Olympic records were as follows.

The following records were established during the competition:

Competition format

The competition consisted of three rounds: heats, semifinals, and a final. The swimmers with the best 16 times in the heats advanced to the semifinals. The swimmers with the best 8 times in the semifinals advanced to the final. Swim-offs were used as necessary to break ties for advancement to the next round.

Results

Heats

Semifinals

Semifinal 1

Semifinal 2

Final

References

Women's 00100 metre breaststroke
Olympics
2016 in women's swimming
Women's events at the 2016 Summer Olympics